L'Orignal Jail is a former jail in L'Orignal, Ontario, Canada built between 1824 and 1825 and decommissioned in 1998. It has since been restored and opened for guided tours during the summer. L'original has had 5 hangings.

References

Defunct prisons in Ontario
Buildings and structures in the United Counties of Prescott and Russell
Museums in the United Counties of Prescott and Russell
Prison museums in Canada
Tourist attractions in the United Counties of Prescott and Russell
1825 establishments in Upper Canada
1998 disestablishments in Ontario